The Pigman & Me is an autobiography by Paul Zindel. It was first published in 1990 by Bantam Starfire. The book is considered an unofficial triquel to the 1968 fiction bestseller The Pigman and is part of The Pigman series of books.

See also

The Pigman
The Pigman's Legacy

References

1990 books
Works by Paul Zindel